Annie Vera Pearce (27 May 1895 – 18 January 1966) was an Australian stage and film actress. Her lengthy career was carried out in both her home country and in England.

Biography

Born in Broken Hill (New South Wales), Pearce spent much of her youth in Adelaide, and made her stage debut there at age five with the World's Entertainers She went on to train as a juvenile performer in pantomimes and musical comedies produced by J. C. Williamson Ltd, and in 1910 scored much acclaim for her role in the Firm's hit production Our Miss Gibbs (1910).

After making her film debut in The Shepherd of the Southern Cross (1914), Pearce went to England with the aim of carving out a career there but was induced to return to Australia shortly afterwards by Hugh D. McIntosh, General Manager of Harry Rickards Tivoli Theatres Ltd.

Pearce made her return to the Australian stage in November 1914 as one of the stars of the Tivoli Follies revue, and remained with the show throughout its two and a half year tour around the country. Among the other productions she appeared in over the next seven years were The Beauty Shop (1917), My Lady Frayle (1919), The Officers' Mess (1919), His Little Widows (1920) and Chu Chin Chow (1920), in which she played Zahrat-al-Kulub opposite Charles H. Workman (as Ali Baba).

Pearce moved to the UK in 1922, with one of her earliest shows being Love's Awakening. She went on to work consistently on the London stage in musicals and pantomimes up until her death. In 1954 she appeared with Ralph Lynn and Robertson Hare in the West End farce The Party Spirit. Her last notable appearance, though, was in a 1957 New York City production of Georges Feydeau's farce Hotel Paradise (aka L'Hôtel du libre échange). She also appeared in at least 16 films between 1931 and 1966.

Personal life
Pearce was in a long-term relationship with a married man, Hugh D. McIntosh. Her nephew Harold Holt became Prime Minister of Australia ten days after Pearce's death.

Historical note
Pearce won two beauty contests in Australia. The first was promoted by West's Pictures in Sydney in 1911. The second event, the 1916 White City Beauty Competition, created controversy when it became known that the judges were linked to the vaudeville industry. The revelation also led to a number of 100-1 bets being placed by well-known "sporting gentlemen" for Pearce to win. When she was announced the winner the huge audience reportedly went "frigidly silent [being] too astounded to take the result seriously"

Filmography

References

External links

Australian theatre credits at AusStage

1895 births
1966 deaths
Actresses from New South Wales
Australian stage actresses
Australian film actresses
People from Broken Hill, New South Wales
Australian expatriate actresses in the United Kingdom